Copris arizonensis is a species of dung beetle in the family Scarabaeidae.

References

Further reading

External links

 

Coprini
Articles created by Qbugbot
Beetles described in 1906